The 1978 NCAA Division I Wrestling Championships were the 48th NCAA Division I Wrestling Championships to be held. The University of Maryland in College Park, Maryland hosted the tournament at the Cole Field House.

Iowa took home the team championship with 94.5 points despite having no individual champions.

Mark Churella of Michigan was named the Most Outstanding Wrestler and Scott Heaton of Cal Poly-SLO received the Gorriaran Award.

Team results

Individual finals

References

NCAA Division I Wrestling Championship
NCAA
Wrestling competitions in the United States
NCAA Division I  Wrestling Championships
NCAA Division I  Wrestling Championships
NCAA Division I  Wrestling Championships